José Franco (Calobre, March 24, 1936 - Las tablas, May 9, 2022) was a poet from Panama.

Life and career

Early years
Born in Calobre, a city in the Province of Veraguas of Panama.

Adulthood
Served Ambassador to Argentina, Uruguay and Paraguay

Literary works
Smilla en Flor, 3 editions (1973–1985)
La Sangre Derramada (1984)
Una Cruz Verde en el Camino (1979)
Coplas y Fábulas a Pelusa (199)
Redobles al Amanecer (1977)
Horas Testimoniales (1976)
Poemas a mi Patria (1975)
Patria Sagrada (1974)
Dormir con los Muertos (1974)
Cantares a la Revolución (1972)
Proyecto de la Constitución Política de la República de Panamá (1972)
Patria de Dolor y Llanto (1961)
Panamá Defendida, 20 editions (1958–1989)
Sollozos Anónimos (1955)
El Panteón de los Callejones (1990)
Las Luciérnagas de la Muerte (1992)

Awards
1985 - The National Award for Journalism (Seccion Columna)
1984 - The National Award for Journalism (for an Editorial)
1979 - The Ricardo Miró National Poetry Award for "Una Cruz Verde en el Camino"
1976 - The Ricardo Miró National Theater Award for "Redobles al Amanecer"
1975 - The Ricardo Miró national Poetry Award for "Horas Testimoniales"
1964 - The National Poetry Award (Honorable Mention) for "Panamá Defendida"
1965 - The National Literary Award for "Décimas a mi Patria"
1956 - The Bellas Artes Award of the Ministry of Education for "Sollozos Anónimos"
1947 - The Student Federation of Panama Award

References
Franco, José. "Las Luciernagas de la Muerte."  Editorial Universitaria, Panama: 1995.  .

1931 births
Panamanian poets
Panamanian male writers
Male poets
Panamanian journalists
Male journalists
Panamanian novelists
Male novelists
20th-century Panamanian lawyers
Ambassadors of Panama to Argentina
Ambassadors of Panama to Uruguay
Ambassadors of Panama to Paraguay
Living people